Buridava (Burridava) was a Dacian town. situated in Dacia, later Dacia Apulensis, now Romania, on the banks of the river Aluta, now Olt.

Ancient sources

Ptolemy's Geographia

Tabula Peutingeriana

Etymology 

The name is Geto-Thracian

History

Dacian town 

Buridava was the chief trading center of the tribe of the Buri  It was located at Ocnița

Roman times 

Romans built the Buridava castra at Stolniceni (7 km from Ocnița)

Archaeology 

A fragment of a vase carrying the inscription BUR, indicates the name of the Dacian tribe Buridavensi   In addition to the inscriptions in Latin capitals and cursives uncovered in 1973 and 1978, two inscriptions in Greek were discovered in the same years. They both date from the time of Augustus

Gallery

See also 
 Burs (Dacia)
 Buridava (castra)
 Dacian davae
 List of ancient cities in Thrace and Dacia
 Dacia
 Roman Dacia

Notes

References

Ancient

Modern

Further reading 

 
 Buridava

External links 

 Buridava

Dacian towns
Dacian fortresses in Vâlcea County
Historic monuments in Vâlcea County
Archaeological sites in Romania
Ruins in Romania
History of Oltenia